Chevron Theatre is an American, 30-minute, filmed television anthology series, produced by MCA/Revue Productions for first-run syndication. A total of 105 episodes aired from 1952 to 1954. 

Among its guest stars were Natalie Wood, Raymond Burr, Bonita Granville, Buddy Ebsen, Mona Freeman, Craig Stevens, Tommy Rettig, Carolyn Jones, Barbara Billingsley, and Peter Graves.

References

External links

Chevron Theatre at CVTA

1950s American anthology television series
1952 American television series debuts
1954 American television series endings
Black-and-white American television shows
First-run syndicated television programs in the United States